Samira Alikhanzadeh (born 1967) is an Iranian visual artist and painter. She lives and works in Tehran.

Biography 
Born in Tehran, she began painting under the supervision of Aydin Aghdashloo. She studied painting at Alzahra University and earned a BFA degree in painting in 1996 and an MA degree in painting in 1998 at Islamic Azad University.

Alikhanzadeh uses acrylic paint, mirrors and old found images, mainly family photographs, in her work. She uses these images from the past to explore identity and reality in modern Iran. Some works also include actual Persian carpets to evoke the past.

Alikhanzadeh's work has appeared in exhibitions in the United Arab Emirates, Canada, the United States and France. Her art is in the collection of the Los Angeles County Museum of Art. Her work was in the fifth Painting Biennial of the Tehran Museum of Contemporary Art in 2000.

See also 

 List of Iranian women artists

References 

1967 births
Living people
20th-century Iranian women artists
21st-century Iranian women artists
People from Tehran
Islamic Azad University alumni
Al-Zahra University alumni